Vendula Frintová (born 4 September 1983 in Nachod) is a Czech professional triathlete, multiple Czech Champion in various categories such as National Champion of the years 2006 and 2007 and winner of the National Championship Series of the year 2009, Duathlon World Champion of the year 2009, and gold medalist of the World Cup in Mooloolaba 2010.

In the eight years from 2002 to 2009, Vendula Frintová took part in 75 ITU competitions and achieved 37 top ten positions, among which five gold medals.

In her home country, Vendula Frintová represents the Ekol Elite Triathlon Team, and in 2010, again, she also takes part, as an elite guest star, in prestigious German and French circuits, i.e. the German Bundesliga, representing Krefelder Kanu Klub, and the French Club Championship Series Lyonnaise des Eaux, representing TCG 79 Parthenay.
At the opening triathlon of this Grand Prix de Triathlon, Frintová placed 17th, and at the second Lyonnaise des Eaux triathlon in Beauvais she placed 26th, both times being among the three , the best triathletes of the club, and TCG 79 Parthenay, which had only four instead of five triathletes, all of whom foreign guest stars, placed 5th again.

Vendula Frintová holds a degree in anthropology and genetics (Charles University, Prague) and, when in the Czech Republic, she lives in her home town Nachod.

ITU Competitions 
In the nine years from 2002 to 2010, Frintová took part in 81 ITU competitions and achieved 36 top ten positions, among which 19 medals.
The list is based upon the official ITU rankings and the Athlete's Profile Page, which, however, is not complete.
Unless indicated otherwise, the following events are triathlons (Olympic Distance) and belong to the Elite category.

BG = the sponsor British Gas · DNF = did not finish · DNS = did not start

Notes

External links 
  
 
 
 
 
 

1983 births
Living people
Czech female triathletes
Olympic triathletes of the Czech Republic
Triathletes at the 2008 Summer Olympics
Triathletes at the 2012 Summer Olympics
Triathletes at the 2016 Summer Olympics
People from Náchod
Triathletes at the 2020 Summer Olympics
Sportspeople from the Hradec Králové Region
Charles University alumni